is a kaishu kata of Goju-ryu karate. It was taught by Goju-ryu's founder, Chojun Miyagi, who in turn learned it from his teacher, Kanryo Higaonna. Seiunchin can be interpreted to mean "pulling".

Meibukan karateka believe that this kata originated in Hsing-I and that Seiunchin's direct translation has been lost. Meibukan karateka refer to it as "Marching far Quietly".

Seiunchin is a unique kata because only hand techniques are used. Seiunchin uses shiko dachi and incorporates strikes such as the back fist and elbow. 

Seiunchin was brought to Isshinryu, another Okinawan style, by Tatsuo Shimabuku: he learned it from Chojun Miyagi while studying Goju-ryu.

References

Karate kata
Gōjū-ryū